Jules Van Der Goten was a Belgian weightlifter. He competed in the men's light heavyweight event at the 1928 Summer Olympics.

References

External links

Year of birth missing
Year of death missing
Belgian male weightlifters
Olympic weightlifters of Belgium
Weightlifters at the 1928 Summer Olympics
Place of birth missing
20th-century Belgian people